Women is a novel by Romanian author Mihail Sebastian. It was first published in Romanian as Femei in 1933. It was released in English in 2019 by Aurora Metro Books (U.K., translated by Gabi Reigh) and Other Press (U.S.A., translated by Philip Ó Ceallaigh). It was rereleased by Penguin European Writers in 2020.

Women is in four parts, presented chronologicaly, each focussing on a different stage in the life of Stefan Valeriu, and the women in his life then. Together the parts form a portrait of life in interwar Europe.

References

1933 novels
Romanian novels
Other Press books